Harmony Cats is a 1992 Canadian comedy film, directed by Sandy Wilson.

Plot
Harmony Cats is about a violinist named Graham Braithwaite (Kim Coates) who plays with a British Columbia symphony. One day, the symphony stops playing permanently and Graham is left to find work elsewhere. He joins a country music band as a bassist and becomes caught between members of the new band.

Production
The film received $333,140 from BC Film.

Recognition

References

Works cited

External links
 

1992 films
English-language Canadian films
Films set in British Columbia
Films shot in British Columbia
1992 comedy films
Canadian comedy films
Animated films about music and musicians
Films directed by Sandy Wilson
1990s English-language films
1990s Canadian films